Phyllonorycter monspessulanella is a moth of the family Gracillariidae. It is known from Germany, France, Italy, Croatia and Portugal.

The larvae feed on Acer campestre and Acer monspessulanum species. They mine the leaves of their host plant. They create a lower-surface tentiform mine.

References

monspessulanella
Moths of Europe
Moths described in 1897